Shaunie Henderson (née Nelson, formerly O'Neal; born November 27, 1974), is an American television personality and one of the executive producers of VH-1's reality TV series Basketball Wives, Basketball Wives LA, and Baller Wives. She was formerly a film marketer and ex-wife of former NBA player Shaquille O'Neal.

Career 
Shaunie is one of the executive producers of Basketball Wives, a reality series that follows the wives, ex-wives, and girlfriends of professional basketball players. Another reality television show, Basketball Wives LA, follows the Los Angeles wives, ex-wives, and girlfriends of professional basketball players. O'Neal is the center of a third reality television series, Shaunie's Home Court, a reality series that follows the lives of her five children and family.

Personal life 
On December 26, 2002, she married basketball player Shaquille O'Neal at the Beverly Hills Hotel. They got engaged after dating for two years and married two years later. Before and during their marriage, the couple had four children: Shareef (b. 2000), Amirah (b. 2001), Shaqir (b. 2003), and Me'arah (b. 2006). Shaunie has a son, Myles, from a previous relationship, while Shaquille O'Neal has a daughter, Taahirah, with his former girlfriend Arnetta Yardbourgh. Shaquille and Shaunie separated after five years of marriage on September 4, 2007, but reconciled shortly after. On November 10, 2009, Shaunie filed for divorce, citing "irreconcilable differences". The divorce was finalized in 2011. Their oldest son, Shareef, is a standout basketball player, who committed to UCLA in 2018, and later transferred to LSU in 2020.

Shaunie married Pastor Keion Henderson in Anguilla in 2022.

References

External links 

Living people
Television producers from Texas
American women television producers
American socialites
People from Wichita Falls, Texas
Shaquille O'Neal
1974 births
Participants in American reality television series
Basketball players' wives and girlfriends